The archaic smile was used by sculptors in Archaic Greece, especially in the second quarter of the 6th century BCE, possibly to suggest that their subject was alive and infused with a sense of well-being. One of the most famous examples of the archaic smile is the Kroisos Kouros, and the Peplos Kore is another. 

By the middle of the Archaic Period of ancient Greece (roughly 800 BCE to 480 BCE), the art that proliferated contained images of people who had the archaic smile, as evidenced by statues found in excavations all across the Greek mainland, Asia Minor, and on islands in the Aegean Sea. The significance of the convention is not known although it is often assumed that for the Greeks, that kind of smile reflected a state of ideal health and well-being. It has also been suggested that it is simply the result of a technical difficulty in fitting the curved shape of the mouth to the somewhat-blocklike head typical of Archaic sculpture. Richard Neer theorizes that the archaic smile may actually be a marker of status, since aristocrats of multiple cities throughout Greece were referred to as the Geleontes or "smiling ones". There are alternative views to the archaic smile being "flat and quite unnatural looking". John Fowles describes the archaic smile in his novel The Magus as "full of the purest metaphysical good humour [...] timelessly intelligent and timelessly amused. [...] Because a star explodes and a thousand worlds like ours die, we know this world is. That is the smile: that what might not be, is [...] When I die, I shall have this by my bedside. It is the last human face I want to see."

There is a visual connection between the Greek archaic smile and the smiles found on Etruscan artworks during the same time period nearby on the east side of the Italian peninsula. An example of this commonly featured in art history texts is the Sarcophagus of the Spouses, a terracotta work found in the necropolis of Cerveteri. It features a smiling couple reclined seemingly at a banquet. The slight geometric stylization, level of realism and physical scale are also strikingly similar to Greek works from this period featuring the archaic smile.

See also 
 Ancient Greek art
 Baekje smile

References

External links 
 The Dying Warrior from the Temple of Alphaisa
 

Archaic Greek sculpture
Iconography
Visual motifs